The Ourse River (French: “Rivière de l’Ourse”) is a tributary of the Allard River, in Eeyou Istchee Baie-James (municipality), in the administrative region of Nord-du-Québec, in Canadian province of Quebec, in Canada. The course of this river flows in the cantons of Vezza and Cavelier.

This hydrographic slope is served on the South side by Route 109 (East-West direction). The surface of the river is usually frozen from early November to mid-May, however, safe ice circulation is generally from mid-November to mid-April.

Geography 
The main neighboring hydrographic slopes are:
North side: Allard River, Gouault River;
East side: Allard River, Véract Creek, Bell River;
South side: Allard River, Dollard Creek;
West side: Adam River, Harricana River, McClure Creek.

The "Ourse River" originates from a forest stream located at:
 South-West of the mouth of the "Ourse River";
 South-West of downtown Matagami.

From its source in the canton of Vezza, the "Ourse river" flows on  according to the following segments:
 North, to the southern limit of the Cavalier township;
 North in Cavalier township, to a creek (coming from the West);
 East, to a creek (coming from the South);
 northeasterly to the mouth of the river.

The "Ourse River" flows on the southwestern shore of the Allard River. This confluence is located at:
 South-West of the mouth of the Allard River (confluence with Matagami Lake);
 Southeast of the mouth of the Nottaway River (confluence with Rupert Bay);
 South of downtown Matagami;
 South-West of Matagami Lake.

Toponymy 
The name "Rivière de l'Ourse" (in French) was made official on November 21, 1972 at the Commission de toponymie du Québec, at the creation of this commission

References

See also 
James Bay
Rupert Bay
Nottaway River, a watercourse
Lake Matagami, a body of water
Allard River, a watercourse
List of rivers of Quebec

Rivers of Nord-du-Québec